Stéphane Diagana (born 23 July 1969 in Saint-Affrique, Aveyron) is a retired, French track and field sprinter and hurdler. His specialities were the 400 metres hurdles and the 4 x 400 metres relay.

Diagana won the  400 metres hurdles gold medal at the 1997 World Championships in Athens and the 4 x 400 metres relay gold medal at the 2003 World Championships in Paris.  In 2002 he won the 400 metres hurdles gold medal at the European Championships in Munich. Diagana also set a new, European 400 metres hurdles outdoor record of 47.37 sec. in Lausanne, Switzerland on 5 July 1995. This record stood until June 2019.

In his only Olympic appearance, Diagana finished in fourth position in the final of the 400 metres hurdles of the  1992 Olympics in Barcelona. In that Olympics, his 4 x 400 metres relay team was eliminated in the heats.

Diagana retired from competition in 2004 and became a television commentator and advisor to the Fédération française d'athlétisme (French Athletics Federation).

On 7 April 2008, Diagana was an Olympic torch runner for the 2008 Olympics. While he was running with the torch in Paris,  Paris city councillor Sylvain Garel tried to snatch it from his hands.

On 21 January 2011, Diagana was seriously injured in road accident while he was cycling along a road of the Col de Vence in the department of Alpes-Maritimes in southeast France. He was airlifted by helicopter to a hospital in Nice. He suffered head injuries and although in a serious condition, he did not lose consciousness.

He is married to Odile Lesage, with whom he has three children.

References

External links

 

1969 births
Living people
Sportspeople from Aveyron
French sportspeople of Senegalese descent
French male hurdlers
French male sprinters
Athletes (track and field) at the 1992 Summer Olympics
Olympic athletes of France
World Athletics Championships athletes for France
World Athletics Championships medalists
European Athletics Championships medalists
Knights of the Ordre national du Mérite
ESCP Europe alumni
Mediterranean Games gold medalists for France
Mediterranean Games medalists in athletics
Athletes (track and field) at the 1993 Mediterranean Games
World Athletics Championships winners